Denise Morel (born 10 August 1946) is a French writer and psychiatrist. She was born in Setif, Algeria, the youngest of four children. Between the ages of 8 to 14, she lived in Bône. The family left Algeria in 1961 to live in Marseille. She studied in Aix-en-Provence and Paris, obtaining a PhD in clinical psychology from Université Paris V.

She has written numerous books, among them Setif de ma jeunesse, a well-regarded memoir of growing up in Setif. Her ancestors were of Swiss and Maltese origin. She studied religion for a few years in Lyon.

Selected works

 2018 - Qui est Dieu ?, Les impliqués/L'Harmattan, Paris. 
2016 - Souffle divin. 
2016 - Symphonie versaillaise, textes sur Versailles, écrits en atelier d'écriture, 
2014 - Le Voyage des Mots, El Ibriz, Alger. 
2013 - Terre aimée, Algérie, El Ibriz, Alger. 
2012 - L'Animal medium, Edilivre. 
2011 - Dialogue avec mon cancer, Éditions du Cerf. 
 2007 - Une Mère de papier, Scriban.
 2006 - Les Brodeuses de l’Histoire, Éditions Coop Breizh.
 2005 - 12 étapes pour écrire votre livre, Scriban.
 2005 - Energie des hiéroglyphes, Scriban.
 2004 - Cette année je me prends au mot et j'écris !, Diateino.
 2004 - Avec Sekhmet, Scriban.
 2003 - Secrets d’écrivain, Éditions Diateino.               
 2003 - Pour ne plus rester victime, Scriban.     
 2001 - Sétif de ma jeunesse, Éditions Gandini.
 2001 - Symboles et couleurs, co-auteur : M. Feller, Scriban.
 1999 - À l’aube, Scriban.
 1997 - Célébration de l’écriture, Cité de l’Écriture.
 1994 - Les Enfants de Pitchipoï, France-Empire
 1991 - Qui est vivant ? Éditions Dervy.
 1989 - Le Pays de l’étrange, Éditions Papyrus.
 1988 - Porter un talent, porter un symptôme ; familles créatrices, Éditions Universitaires.
 1984 - Cancer et psychanalyse,  Éditions Belfond.

References

1946 births
People from Sétif
French people of Maltese descent
French people of Swiss descent
French women writers
French psychiatrists
Pieds-Noirs
Living people
French women psychiatrists